Alexander Pilhatsch (born 25 March 1963) is an Austrian swimmer. He competed at the 1984 Summer Olympics and the 1988 Summer Olympics.

His father Arnulf Pilhatsch was an Olympic athlete for Austria.

References

External links
 

1963 births
Living people
Austrian male freestyle swimmers
Olympic swimmers of Austria
Swimmers at the 1984 Summer Olympics
Swimmers at the 1988 Summer Olympics
Sportspeople from Graz